is a city in Fukushima Prefecture, Japan. ,  the city has an estimated population of 54,013 in 20,179 households, and a population density of 160 persons per km2. The Adachi neighborhood of Nihonmatsu was the birthplace of artist Chieko Takamura, subject of the book of poems , written by her husband Kōtarō Takamura.

Geography
Nihonmatsu is located in the Nakadōri section of Fukushima prefecture, between the cities of Fukushima and Kōriyama. It is approximately 250 km from central Tokyo. Nihonmatsu's western border consists of the Adatara mountain range. The Abukuma River runs through the eastern part (forming the border between the former towns of Adachi and Tōwa), flowing from south to north.

Lakes: Miharu Dam
Mountains: Mount Adatara (1,728 m), Hiyama (1,054 m), Kohatayama (666.3 m)
Rivers: Abukuma River

Neighboring municipalities
Fukushima Prefecture
Fukushima
Kōriyama
Tamura
Motomiya
Namie
Katsurao 
Kawamata
Ōtama 
Inawashiro

Climate
Nihonmatsu has a humid subtropical climate (Köppen Cfa) characterized by mild summers and cold winters with heavy snowfall.  The average annual temperature in Nihonmatsu is 12.0 °C. The average annual rainfall is 1215 mm with September as the wettest month. The temperatures are highest on average in August, at around 25.0 °C, and lowest in January, at around 0.3 °C.

Demographics
Per Japanese census data, the population of Nihonmatsu peaked around 1950 and has since declined to pre-1920s levels.

History
The area of present-day Nihonmatsu was part of ancient Mutsu Province. It developed as post station on the Ōshū Kaidō highway and as the castle town of Nihonmatsu Domain, a 100,700 koku han, which was ruled by the Niwa clan under the Tokugawa shogunate) in the Edo period.  After the Meiji Restoration, it was organized as part of Adachi District in the Nakadōri region of Iwaki Province.

The town of Nihonmatsu was established with the creation of the modern municipalities system on April 1, 1889. Nihonmatsu annexed the neighboring villages of Shiozawa, Dakeshita, Sugita, Ishii and Ohdaira on January 1, 1955 and was elevated to city status on October 1, 1958. The city annexed the towns of Adachi, Iwashiro and Tōwa (all from Adach District) on December 1, 2005.

Government
Nihonmatsu has a mayor-council form of government with a directly elected mayor and a unicameral city legislature of 26 members. Nihonmatsu contributes two members to the Fukushima Prefectural Assembly. In terms of national politics, the city is part of Fukushima 2nd district of the lower house of the Diet of Japan.

Economy
Nihonmatsu is a regional commercial center with a mixed economy. It is especially noted for furniture manufacturing and sake brewing.

Education
Nihonmatsu has 16 public elementary schools and seven public junior high school operated by the city government, and three public high schools operated by the Fukushima Board of Education.
Fukushima Prefectural Adachi High School
Fukushima Prefectural Adachi Higashi High School
Fukushima Prefectural Nihonmatsu Industrial High School

Transportation

Railway
JR East -  Tōhoku Main Line
  -  -

Highway
  – Nihonmatsu Interchange

International relations
  – Hanover, New Hampshire, United States, since July 30, 1999
  – Jingshan County, Hubei Province, China, Friendship city since October 16, 1994

Local attractions

Tourist spot 

Nihonmatsu Castle, also known as Kasumiga Castle, is a historical castle along with a park. Nihonmatsu Castle is one of Japan's Top 100 Castles. Nihonmatsu Castle has also been called one of the top 100 sites in Japan for cherry blossom viewing by Wikivoyage.
Obama Castle, historical castle ruins
, onsen resort located in western Nihonmatsu.
Ebisu Circuit, famous drift racing track, adjacent to Tohoku Safari Park.
 The Nihonmatsu Lantern Festival is held every October 4–6. The festival has been held annually since 1643 and is one of the three largest lantern festivals in Japan.

Sake
Nihonmatsu has a long history of sake brewing, with several sake breweries headquartered in the city:
 , established in 1752, one of the few breweries that continues to use the traditional kimoto brewing process. Tours are available.
 , established in 1716.
 , established in 1897.
Himonoya, maker of the Senkonari brand sake.

Notable people from Nihonmatsu
Kan'ichi Asakawa, academic
Chieko Takamura, artist
Michiro Endo, musician, political activist
Yuki Takamiya, long-distance runner

References

External links

Official website 
 Nihonmatsu Tourism Federation 

 
Cities in Fukushima Prefecture